The geographical setting of the Book of Mormon is the set of locations of the events described in the Book of Mormon. There is no universal consensus among Mormon scholars regarding the placement of these locations in the known world, other than somewhere in the Americas. A popular "traditional" view among many Latter-day Saint faithful covers much of North and South America; while many Book of Mormon scholars, particularly in recent decades, believe the text itself favors a limited Mesoamerican or other limited setting for most of the Book of Mormon events.

The largest of the churches embracing the Book of Mormon—The Church of Jesus Christ of Latter-day Saints (LDS Church)—has not endorsed an official position for the geographical setting the Book of Mormon, although some of its leaders have spoken of various possible locations over the years. There have also been multiple attempts to identify the several civilizations in the Book of Mormon, which are dated in the text as living from 2500 BC to 400 AD, but no consensus has ever been reached.

According to Joseph Smith, an angel named Moroni told him "there was a book deposited, written upon gold plates, giving an account of the former inhabitants of this continent, and the source from whence they sprang." According to Joseph Smith, Moroni explained that the coming forth of the Book of Mormon was to be concurrent with the fulfillment of ancient prophecies regarding the latter-day church of Christ. According to Latter Day Saint scripture, the narrative in the Book of Mormon came to an end in the ancient land Cumorah, where Moroni, in 421 AD deposited the golden plates prior to his death. Mormon and Moroni's Cumorah is claimed by many believers to be the same land containing the modern "Hill Cumorah" near Joseph Smith's home in Palmyra, western New York, from whence the gold plates of the Book of Mormon were retrieved. Others view the modern "Hill Cumorah" to be distinct from the original, and simply to have been named after it; thus adding no information to the question of the location of the lands described in the Book of Mormon.

Internal map

The Book of Mormon itself is the best source for understanding the geographical locations contained therein. Internal Book of Mormon geography focuses on the relationships between lands and other geographic features, independent of where they might be physically located on today's maps. The purpose of constructing unbiased internal maps is to orient major lands, seas and landmarks mentioned in the text, and estimate relative distances between them; without trying to 'fit them' into any proposed setting on a modern map. A careful investigation of the Book of Mormon's internal geography is useful to guard against bias by researchers using favored "known-world" settings and/or traditions.

The following is a brief overview of the Book of Mormon's New World (American) internal geography. Three groups are known to have migrated: Jaredites, Lehites and Mulekites:

The Jaredites along with 22 other families landed in what was later called the "Land Northward" during the time of the building of the "great tower." There is no mention of any of the other families after the landing. It is presumed that they remained with the descendants of Jared and his brother, but this is inconclusive. The Jaredites remained there until destroyed between 600 and 300 BC. Their land is described as being surrounded by four "seas" with a "Narrow Neck" linking to a "Land Southward" to which they never ventured except for hunting. This core area does not preclude expansions into areas beyond the north, east or west seas.
The Lehites landed on the coast of the "Land Southward" around 589 BC. The term "Land Southward" seems to be used in different contexts as the Nephites gradually migrate Northward with what is possibly an explicitly-defined change in the terminology in Alma 22:31-32. The Land Southward was nearly surrounded by seas. One sea which was near the dividing line of the latter definition of the "Land Southward" from the "Land Northward" was described as the "Sea that Divides the Land." The Book of Mormon does not explicitly identify the "West Sea" or the "East Sea" with the "waters of the great deep", "great waters" or "many waters" crossed by Book of Mormon peoples to the New World.
The Mulekites landed in the Land Northward around 587 BC and proceeded southward through the Narrow Neck, founding the city "Zarahemla" which was in the heart of the land along the river "Sidon."

After arriving in the New World, Nephi, a son of Lehi, left the place of their first landing and traveled with his followers "many days" in the wilderness. "Many" is a non-specific word that can mean anything from "three hours" to "forty days." This particular journey did not take Nephi and his followers beyond the territory that would later be called the land of Nephi. Numerous other travel times are mentioned within the Book of Mormon, generally just days or less. Thus the text of the Book of Mormon is often viewed by scholars as favoring a 'limited' setting of just a few hundred miles for most of its events. For example, a group ostensibly consisting of the very young and old with "their flocks" and some belongings, could travel from the land of Nephi "down" through a "strip" of wilderness to the land of Zarahemla in less than 21 days.

The land of Zarahemla is north of the land of Nephi. The lands of Zarahemla and Nephi are near an east and a west sea. A narrow strip of wilderness divides the land of Zarahemla from the southern land of Nephi. The region of Zarahemla features the nearby river "Sidon" - the only river named in the localized New World setting. The shallow (it could be crossed on foot) river Sidon originates in highlands to the south of the city of Zarahemla, near a land and city called Manti which is at the head of the river Sidon.
 The land of Bountiful lies far north of the land of Zarahemla. A fortified line between the land of Zarahemla and the land of Bountiful could be crossed in a single day from the west sea to the east [sea]. There is explicit reference to a "sea" east of the land of Zarahemla, as far north as the southern borders of Bountiful. A sea east of Bountiful seems to be implied.
The land of Desolation is north of Bountiful. The border between the land of Bountiful and Desolation is also described as a "line" running from "the east to west sea". This "line" could be traversed by a Nephite in "only" a day and a half, presumably by boat, because the vicinity of Desolation was a "place where the sea divides the land".  A "narrow pass" or "passage" ran northward near the Bountiful/Desolation border which is mentioned in context with the nearby east and west seas. In contrast to the breadth of the Desolation / Bountiful border, the entrance to "the narrow pass which led into the land northward" is described as a "point". Elsewhere in the Book of Mormon, a "narrow" or "small neck of land", by the border of the land Bountiful and the land Desolation is described connecting "the land northward and the land southward". Serving as the entrance to "the land south", this pass, or perhaps the whole "narrow neck of land", appears to have been narrow enough to be blocked by a "poisonous serpents" epidemic.
The land northward is covered "with large bodies of water and many rivers." The land is bordered in each of the cardinal directions by bodies of water called seas. There are limits to how far north the land extends.
Cumorah situates in "a land of many waters, rivers, and fountains", south of a particularly "large" body of water called "Ripliancum" and east of the Jaredite Land Northward. The land of Cumorah was the decisive gathering place of both the Nephite and earlier Jaredite armies. The Jaredite King Omer and his family settled east of the place where the Nephites nation would be destroyed. Lands south of Cumorah, where a "few" Nephites had temporarily escaped destruction, are referred to as the "south countries". This "country southward" may have been beyond the borders of principal Book of Mormon lands frequently mentioned in the text. A Jaredite land of  "many waters" and Zarahemla were near enough to each other, that travelers from the land of Nephi in the south could confuse the general region where the Jaredite nation was destroyed with the land of Zarahemla.

Numerous other details in the Book of Mormon indicate principal lands that are quite localized, generally negating the possibility that the Book of Mormon settings cover major parts of both North and South America.

Clark 1989
John E Clark, Review of Books on the Book of Mormon, vol 1, 1989, pp. 20–70.

Lauritzen
Source: BYU Library (call number MOR M222 A1a #33). John Sorenson notes in his book, The Geography of the Book of Mormon:  A Source Book the following on page 102,

"This map is identical in practically all substantive details to Ludlow et al. ... The near identity of these three maps raises a question of directions of unattributed influence. If not plagiarism, at least an odd kind of liberty comes to mind."

Layton 1938
Source: Lynn C. Layton, An "Ideal" Book of Mormon Geography, Improvement Era 41 (July 1938): pp. 394–395.

Joseph Smith's statements regarding Book of Mormon geography
Published articles in the Times & Seasons newspaper (of which Joseph Smith was the editor) indicate that Book of Mormon peoples, or their descendants, migrated from "the lake country of America" to Mexico and Central America. In 1841 Joseph Smith read Stephens' Incidents of Travel in Central America. Smith held Stephens' work in high regard and recommended it. However, Stephens' bestseller did not change Smith's position that Book of Mormon events took place in northern America, in lands primarily occupied by the United States.

In the Wentworth Letter Joseph Smith wrote the following regarding his interview with the angel Moroni:I was also informed concerning the aboriginal inhabitants of this country', and shown who they were, and from whence they came; a brief sketch of their origin, progress, civilization, laws, governments, of their righteousness and iniquity, and the blessings of God being finally withdrawn from them as a people was made known unto me: I was also told where there was deposited some plates on which were engraven an abridgment of the records of the ancient prophets that had existed on this continent ...In his "AMERICAN ANTIQUITIES" editorial of July 1842, the Times & Seasons newspaper corroborates wars described in the Book of Mormon with archaeological finds in northern America. It is not certain as to which articles in the Times & Seasons signed "-ED" were authored by Joseph Smith, approved by Joseph Smith, or otherwise handled by editorial assistants since Joseph Smith was frequently absent and only the nominal editor.

The Times & Seasons quotes Josiah Priest's American Antiquities statement that "Weapons of brass have been found in many parts of America, as in the Canadas, Florida, &c., with curiously sculptured stones, all of which go to prove that this country was once peopled with civilized, industrious nations ..."

The Times & Seasons associates earth, timber and metal works found in northern America (presumably artifacts of mound builder societies) with implements and constructions described in the Book of Mormon. As much as Joseph Smith approved of Stephens' work, the Times & Seasons only makes minor mention of it, and then only to conclude in the "American Antiquities" editorial, that the peoples of Central America are tied historically to the Book of Mormon. Regarding the peoples of Central America, the Times & Seasons concludes:
Stephens and Catherwood's researches in Central America abundantly testify of this thing. The stupendous ruins, the elegant sculpture, and the magnificence of the ruins of Guatemala, and other cities, corroborate this statement, and show that a great and mighty people-men of great minds, clear intellect, bright genius, and comprehensive designs inhabited this continent. Their ruins speak of their greatness; the Book of Mormen [Mormon] unfolds their history.-ED.

The article does not actually say that Book of Mormon lands are to be found in Central America. This assertion came later in several unsigned newspaper articles, published in the Fall of 1842. The use of first person plural ("we" and "us") indicates that the articles may have been a collaborative effort. A recent "word-print" stylometry study of the unsigned articles concluded that they contain Joseph Smith's vocabulary and average sentence lengths. One LDS apologist, however, argues that the statistical word-print analysis cannot identify everything that was edited in the articles and by whom. Without an endorsing signature we cannot tell the extent to which Joseph Smith agreed with the opinions expressed in the unsigned articles.

In the March 15, 1842 edition of the Times and Seasons, Joseph Smith informed readers that he would endorse his articles with his signature. W. Vincent Coon argues that the unsigned 1842 articles contradict each other. One of the articles in question mentions "Joseph Smith" in the third person. This same article alleges that Lehi "landed a little south of the Isthmus of Darien" which would place Lehi's landing on a western shore of South America. The 1842 Times and Seasons editorials, written by Joseph Smith, are readily identified as they end with his "ED".
Joseph Smith had found it necessary to go into hiding for much of the Fall that year. Though he was still official editor of the Times and Seasons, it is doubtful that he was acting editor at the time inasmuch as he was keeping a low public profile and had been in hiding, as Doctrine and Covenants 127:1 and 128:1 attest. LDS Church History Scholars believe that John Taylor may have served as "the acting editor for the Times and Seasons" in Joseph's absence.  In November 1842, Joseph Smith officially resigned as editor, explaining that, "The multiplicity of other business that daily devolves upon me, renders it impossible for me to do justice to a paper so widely circulated as the Times and Seasons." John Taylor was then made official editor of the newspaper.

Published in the same issue as the unsigned "ZARAHEMLA" article (October 1842) with its anachronistic claims about the ruins of Quirigua, is a signed epistle to the church from the Mormon prophet in hiding. In Joseph Smith's letter (canonized as the 128th section of the LDS Doctrine and Covenants) the Book of Mormon land Cumorah is referenced among other locations of significance near the Finger Lakes.

Several earlier statements by Joseph Smith, indicate that events described in the Book of Mormon took place in lands occupied by the United States of America. In an 1833 letter to N.C. Saxton, he wrote:
The Book of Mormon is a record of the forefathers of our western tribes of Indians … . By it we learn that our western tribes of Indians are descendants from that Joseph that was sold into Egypt, and that the land [of] America is a promised land unto them, and unto it, all the tribes of Israel will come, with as many of the Gentiles as shall comply with the requisitions of the new covenant. But the tribe of Judah will return to old Jerusalem.

The expression, "our western tribes of Indians" refers to Indian tribes who lived west, or were pushed west from the east coast of the United States by European expansion. LDS missionaries were sent to these peoples in the early days of the Church. Latter-day scripture refers to these peoples as "Lamanites". Several passages in LDS scripture associate these native peoples with peoples of the Book of Mormon. LDS scripture teaches that the land of their Book of Mormon ancestors (presumably the territories now occupied by the United States of America) was ordained to become a land "free unto all ...". The ancient land of their inheritance is, according to LDS scripture, associated with the land of "New Jerusalem.". New Jerusalem, "the city of Zion" is, according to LDS scripture to be built in northern America.

Some scholars argue that Joseph Smith came to believe that the Maya ruins on the Yucatán Peninsula discovered in the late 1830s, offered evidence in support of the Book of Mormon's authenticity. A more recent inclusion in History of the Church proclaims the ruins were likely Nephite or belonging to "the ancient inhabitants of America treated of in the Book of Mormon". In view of the position that ancient peoples migrated from the north into Mexico and Central America, the linking of Mesoamerican artifacts with "ancient inhabitants ... of ... the Book of Mormon" is not inconsistent with Joseph Smith's statements placing Book of Mormon lands in northern America. The History of the Church statement was inserted under the date June 25, 1842 and is not taken from any holograph writing of Joseph Smith or records kept by his clerks. The date, in fact, is only a few weeks prior to the publication of the AMERICAN ANTIQUITIES editorial, citing northern American evidence of Book of Mormon history. The inclusion in History of the Church reads as follows:
Messrs. Stephens and Catherwood have succeeded in collecting in the interior of America a large amount of relics of the Nephites, or the ancient inhabitants of America treated of in the Book of Mormon, which relics have recently been landed in New York.

Stephens brought to New York hundreds of artifacts from Mayan sites, including sculptures and architectural remnants. Shortly after arriving in New York, most of these relics were lost when the building that housed them was destroyed by fire.

The Copan and Quirigua, sites in the Yucatan visited by Stephens and Catherwood, contain artifacts that date more recent than Book of Mormon times. It has not been shown that any of Stephens' artifacts date to Book of Mormon times, and Joseph Smith does not make this assertion.

The first history of the Church was written in 1834 and 1835 by Oliver Cowdery, as a series of articles published serially in the Church's Messenger and Advocate. In this history, Cowdery stated that the final battle between the Nephites and the Lamanites occurred at the "Hill Cumorah," the very same Hill Cumorah in New York, where Joseph Smith said he obtained golden plates and other artifacts which were used to translate the Book of Mormon. These plates and artifacts were shown to only a few witnesses and never to the general public. The plates were later claimed to have been returned to the angel, Moroni. Oliver Cowdery also identified the Jaredites' final battle as occurring in the same area as the Nephite/Lamanite final battle. Since Smith was an editor of the Messenger and Advocate and approved the history, all but proponents of limited South American and Mesoamerican geography theories believe it conclusively demonstrated Joseph Smith's belief as well. In any case, evidence appears to show that Smith did not subscribe to the limited Mesoamerican or South American geography theories promoted by some LDS today. Joseph Smith clearly advocated a northern American setting (near the Finger Lakes) for the Book of Mormon land Cumorah, hence .

Lucy Mack Smith, Joseph Smith's mother, in her account of the coming forth of the Book of Mormon, says that the divine messenger called the hill where the plates were deposited the "hill of Cumorah" meaning "hill of" the Book of Mormon land "Cumorah". In another account, she said that young Joseph referred to the hill using this description.
Joseph Smith's preeminence as an authority on the Book of Mormon is evinced by the following account given by his mother:
During our evening conversations, Joseph, would occasionally give us some of the most amusing recitals that could be imagined. He would describe the ancient inhabitants of this continent, their dress, mode of traveling, and the animals upon which they rode; their cities and buildings, with every particular; their mode of warfare; and also their religious worship. This he would do with as much ease, seemingly, as if he had spent his whole life among them.

Efforts to associate Joseph Smith with the geographic notions of his contemporaries remain speculative. A note in the handwriting of Frederick G. Williams, a scribe and counselor to Smith, asserts that Lehi's people landed in South America at thirty degrees south latitude. Early LDS church leader, Orson Pratt also speculated that the Nephite landing site was on the coast of Chile near Valparaiso, but Pratt indicated that this hypothesis was arrived at by supposition, not divine revelation. There is no proof that Williams' unsigned, undated writing represents a revelation given to Joseph Smith. In 1938 an article in the Church magazine The Instructor discouraged Church members from making too much of the Williams document.

Hemispheric models
Evidence indicates that early members of the Church did not pay a great deal of attention to Book of Mormon details about distances. The "Hemispheric" or "Two-Continent" model proposes that Book of Mormon lands stretch many thousands of miles over much of South and North America. There is no first hand, verifiable statement by Joseph Smith endorsing this view. One of the earliest advocates of a hemispheric setting was the young missionary Orson Pratt, who as early as 1832 publicly promoted the idea that Lehi "crossed the water into South America". For some who read the Book of Mormon, with maps of the Western Hemisphere in view, the Isthmus of Panama seems an easy fit for the Book of Mormon's "narrow neck of land". Pratt claimed that the "running battle", culminating in the destruction of the Nephite nation, started at "the Isthmus of Darien" (Panama) and "ended at Manchester" (western New York). Pratt never attributed his geography (or one like it) to Joseph Smith. Pratt in fact, indicated that the South American landing idea was supposition, not revelation. Pratt's geographic views were published in the 1879 edition of the Book of Mormon, but retracted from later editions.

There was no consensus of opinion among early Mormon leaders on the topic of Book of Mormon geography. The hemispheric setting of Apostle Parley P. Pratt, for instance, differed from that of his brother Orson. Strongly influenced by John Lloyd Stephens' 1841 bestseller, Incidents of Travel in Central America, Parley Pratt set various Book of Mormon lands (including, apparently, the narrow neck) farther north and west of Panama. As early as 1842, Apostle John E. Page published a more limited, non-hemispheric setting for the Book of Mormon. Page originally placed the narrow neck at the Bay of Honduras; and by 1848 appears to have relocated the narrow neck more to the northwest.  Other LDS, in 1842, figured all of Central America to be the narrow neck. Prior to the influence of John Lloyd Stephens' popular book, some church members placed the southernmost Nephite land of Manti well within the boundaries of United States territory.

In the 1850s the following unsigned statement was circulated among Latter-day Saints:

The course that Lehi traveled from the city of Jerusalem to the place where he and his family took ship, they traveled nearly a south, southeast direction until they came to the nineteenth degree of North Latitude, then, nearly east to the Sea of Arabia then sailed in a southeast direction and landed on the continent of South America in Chili [Chile] thirty degrees south latitude.

The original is in the handwriting of early church leader Frederick G. Williams, who held a definite opinion [citation needed] on the subject of Book of Mormon geography. The statement was partially rewritten by church authorities Richards and Little and published as a "Revelation to Joseph the Seer" - a statement which the original did not contain. The Chilean landing site, promoted in the Williams document, matches Orson Pratt's geography. Prominent LDS would later call into question the statement's authority; but before this would happen, church leaders publicly attributed (without verification or proof) features of Orson Pratt's geography to Joseph Smith. The idea that Lehi landed on the coast of temperate Chile, thousand of miles south of Panama's narrow neck, and that tropical Colombia's thousand mile long Magdalena River is the River Sidon, were presented by church scholars as mainstream, majority views in the LDS community.

Bagley 1927 model
Claims the Narrow Neck of Land is the Isthmus of Tehuantepec.  Source:  JM Sjodahl, An Introduction to the Study of the Book of Mormon, 1927, pp. 415–418.

Comer/Maeser 1880 model
Claims the Narrow Neck of Land is Panama.  Source:  JA and JN Washburn, An Approach to the Study of the Book of Mormon Geography, Provo, Utah, 1939.

Dixon 1958
Source:  Just One Cumorah by Riley Lake Dixon, SLC, Bookcraft, 1958

General 1830s
Source: John L Sorenson, The Geography of the Book of Mormon: a Source Book, FARMS, 1992, pp. 75–76.

Gunsolley 1922
Source:  Jeremiah Gunsolley, A Study of the Book of Mormon. ... , Zions Religio-Literary Society, Herald Publishing House, Lamoni, Iowa, 1917

Hobby/Smith 1988
Source:  Michael Hobby and Troy Smith.  A Model for Nephite Geography.  Zarahemla Quarterly 2(1)(1988): 4-14.
Source:  Hobby, The Mulekite Connection, Zarahemla Quarterly 2(1)(1988): 36ff.

Ricks pre-1921
By 1921 Joel Ricks of Logan had distributed 6000 copies of his map of Book of Mormon geography.
Source: James E. Talmage Journals, 1921, January 14–24. See Joseph Trevor Antley's extracts of Talmage's journal: James E. Talmage Journals, 1921: Book of Mormon Geography Hearings. (WP:DEADLINK)

Also see  the following article:"PANAMA: An Introduction," Michael M. Hobby and Troy J. Smith, Zarahemla Quarterly, Vol Two, No. Two, 1988; pp. 4–20. The following rivers were run by Hobby and Hobby, or Hobby and Smith to determine the minimum crossable land constrictions: Rio Bayano (central Panama), 22 mile passable width; Rio Tuira (eastern Panama), 40 miles from the southern Bay to the Caribbean,reduced by 25-35% due to the width of the lower Tuira (However,significant population existed along rivers to the southeast); Rio Chagres (Canal Zone), 27–40 miles; however, former path of the Chagres is obscured by Lake Gatun, not a natural geomorphological feature. Rio Atrato and tributaries flow into the Gulf of Uraba (also termed the Gulf of Darien, associated with the Darien Gap) Colombia. The Gulf is located at the southeastern terminus of the North Panamanian Deformed Belt, an arc which determines the shape of the Gulf and the Atrato drainage basin, both of which it underlies, including much of the Atrato, still pronounced along the northern part of its length. Hobby asserts that the massive sediment loads deposited by the Atrato (and other rivers flowing into the Gulf on it eastern perimeter) have nearly divided the present gulf in half, due to E/W delta deposits and a highly restricted flow pattern north into the outer gulf he observed in satellite photography. The landlocked lakes to the south were once part of the Gulf. Therefore, he argues that geologic and hydrogeologic data confirm the minimum passable width several thousand years ago was likely as much as 40% or more less than observed today.

Central America models
It has been claimed in recent years, that within the Mormon community, more scholars have gravitated toward this general group of geographic scenarios than any other group of theories. While there are disagreements about where the "narrow neck of land" resides, e.g. southern Mexico, Honduras, the Isthmus of Rivas between Nicaragua and Costa Rica, Panama, the following list of theories can all be categorized as Central American based.

Early LDS became engrossed with John Lloyd Stephens' 1841 bestseller, Incidents of Travel in Central America, Chiapas, and Yucatan. Despite Stephens' own published conclusion that the marvelous stone ruins which he and Frederick Catherwood documented were not of "great antiquity", some LDS nevertheless, placed much importance on matching these stone ruins to Book of Mormon cities. For some, this endeavor had higher priority than looking for the narrowest and correctly oriented Mesoamerican isthmus. In time, more Mormon scholars came to realize that the New World Book of Mormon lands were quite localized.

The earliest, most limited Central American models were posited by members of the RLDS Church. In one detail, none of these proposed settings are exactly limited geographically: they all require Moroni to have transported the plates and other articles thousands of miles to western New York.

LDS apologist Vincent Coon cites non-LDS archaeologist Salvatore Trento, who posits the possibility that Joseph Smith actually discovered buried metal tablets engraved with "weird markings". Trento notes comparable discoveries in Northeastern America which Coon points out are not likely the result of a singular ancient individual traveling thousands of miles from Central or South America. Such finds are consistent with the 19th century "Mound Builder" literary setting in which the Book of Mormon is classed by mainstream American History and Literature specialists.

Sorenson 1985 model
Claims the Narrow Neck of Land is the Isthmus of Tehuantepec, and the basic area is that of Mesoamerica. Source: An Ancient American Setting for the Book of Mormon, By John L. Sorenson, Deseret Book Company, Salt Lake City, UT and Foundation for Ancient Research and Mormon Studies, Provo, Utah, 1985

Allen 1989 model
Claims the Narrow Neck of Land is the Isthmus of Tehuantepec, and the basic area is that of Mesoamerica.  Source:  Exploring the Lands of the Book of Mormon, By Joseph Allen, SA Publishers, Orem, Utah, 1989, pp. 181–390

Christensen 1969
Cheesman's, The World of the Book of Mormon, Deseret Book, 1978.

Davila 1961 model
Claims the Narrow Neck of Land is the Isthmus of Tehuantepec, and the basic area is that of Mesoamerica.  Source:  BYU Library, "An account of our Book of Mormon Lands Tour", 27 January to 16 February 1961.

DeLong-Steede-Simmons 1977 model
Claims the Narrow Neck of Land is the Isthmus of Tehuantepec, and the basic area is that of Mesoamerica.  See FRAA Newsletter 23 (11 May 1976).

Driggs 1925
Claims the Narrow Neck of Land is the Bay of Honduras, and the basic area is that of Mesoamerica.  Source:  Jean Russell Driggs, The Palestine of America, SLC, 1925.

Ellsworth 1980
Claims the Narrow Neck of Land is somewhere in Costa Rica, and the basic area is that of Mesoamerica.  Source:  Robert B Ellsworth, Lectures Notes on an Interpretation of a Map of Zarahemla and the Land Northward as Described in the Book of Mormon, Ogden, Utah, 1980.

Ferguson 1947
Source:  Thomas Stuart Ferguson, Cumorah—Where?, The author, Oakland, CA, 1947.

Ferguson/Hunter 1950
Source:  Ferguson, One Fold and One Shepherd, San Francisco: Books of California, 1953, p. 252

Hammond 1959
Source:  Fletcher B Hammond, Geography of the Book of Mormon, SLC, 1959

Hansen 1951
Source:  Book of Mormon Geography, Saints' Herald, January 8, 1951.

Hauck 1988
Source:  F Richard Hauck, Deciphering the Geography of the Book of Mormon:  Settlements and Routes in Ancient America.  SLC, Deseret Book, 1988.

Hills 1917
Source:  Louis Edward Hills, Geography of Mexico and Central America from 2234 BC to 421 AD, Independence, Missouri, 1917.

Holmes 1903
Source:  Robert Holmes, Geographical Sketches of the Book of Mormon, 1903.  (Located in LDS Church historical Dept)

Jakeman 1940s
Source:  Summarized by Paul R Cheesman, These Ancient Americans, Deseret Book, SLC, 1974, pp. 164–166.

Norman 1966
Claims the Narrow Neck of Land is the Isthmus of Tehuantepec, and the basic area is that of Mesoamerica.

Young 1921
Willard Young claimed that most of the Book of Mormon scenes were in present-day Guatemala and Honduras.
Source: James E. Talmage Journals, 1921, January 14–24. See Joseph Trevor Antley's extracts of Talmage's journal: James E. Talmage Journals, 1921: Book of Mormon Geography Hearings.

Ivins 1921
Apostle Anthony W. Ivins suggested that the Book of Mormon lands embraced mainly Yucatan and Mexico.
Source: James E. Talmage Journals, 1921, January 14–24. See Joseph Trevor Antley's extracts of Talmage's journal: James E. Talmage Journals, 1921: Book of Mormon Geography Hearings.

Heartland models

The "Heartland" Model or "Heartland Theory" of Book of Mormon geography states that the Book of Mormon events primarily occurred in the heartland of North America. The Hill Cumorah in Ontario County NY is the hill where Joseph Smith found the Golden Plates and is the same hill where the civilizations of the Nephites (Cumorah) and the Jaredites (Ramah) fought their last battles. Oliver Cowdery with the assistance of Joseph Smith wrote "... Here, between these hills, the entire power and national strength of both the Jaredites and Nephites were destroyed. By turning to the 529th and 530th pages of the Book of Mormon, you will read Mormon's account of the last great struggle of his people, as they were encamped round this hill Cumorah.  In this valley fell the remaining strength and pride of a once powerful people, the Nephites—once so highly favored of the Lord, but at that time in darkness, doomed to suffer extermination by the hand of their barbarous and uncivilized brethren. From the top of this hill, Mormon, with a few others, after the battle, gazed with horror upon the mangled remains of those who, the day before, were filled with anxiety, hope, or doubt."

Among its proposals are that Mound Builders, including the Hopewell and the Adena, were among those peoples described in accounts of events in Book of Mormon books such as Alma and Helaman. The ancient city of Zarahemla is believed to be near Montrose, Iowa. (D&C 125:3). The Mississippi River is identified as the River Sidon, and the Springs of Northern Georgia just south of Chattanooga, Tennessee are identified as possibly being the Waters of Mormon. The Niagara Falls Peninsula has been described as the "narrow neck of land" mentioned in the Book of Ether. In addition, the Appalachian region of Tennessee is most likely to be the Land of Nephi. It is also proposed that Lehi's journey sailed west after going around Africa which would be a much shorter voyage than across the Indian and Pacific Oceans (as demonstrated by the path of the modern-day "Phoenician" ship's experimental circumnavigation voyage around Africa in 2010 by Philip Beale followed by an Atlantic crossing in 2019-2020). They propose that Lehi and his family landed somewhere near Florida, that the land of Nephi was in Tennessee and that the Mulokites and Jaredites settled the land after traveling along the great lakes river system into Ohio valley and then the proposed Zarahemla site near Montrose, Iowa.

In recent years, this theory, which challenges the traditional paradigm of Central America as a primary location for Book of Mormon geography, has become a "movement" among many active members of the Church of Jesus Christ of Latter-day Saints. Proponents see this new model as a way of better supporting the historical authenticity of the Book of Mormon.

In the Joseph Smith Papers, Joseph Smith had a vision that was written down by Wilford Woodruff, Heber C. Kimball, George A. Smith and many others. "On the top of the mound were stones which presented the appearance of three altars having been erected one above the other, according to the ancient order; and the remains of bones were strewn over the surface of the ground. The brethren procured a shovel and a hoe, and removing the earth to the depth of about one foot, discovered the skeleton of a man, almost entire, and between his ribs the stone point of a Lamanitish arrow, which evidently produced his death. Elder Burr Riggs retained the arrow. The contemplation of the scenery around us produced peculiar sensations in our bosoms; and subsequently the visions of the past being opened to my understanding by the Spirit of the Almighty, I discovered that the person whose skeleton was before us was a white Lamanite, a large, thick-set man, and a man of God. His name was Zelph. He was a warrior and chieftain under the great prophet Onandagus, who was known from the Hill Cumorah, or eastern sea to the Rocky mountains. The curse was taken from Zelph, or, at least, in part-one of his thigh bones was broken by a stone flung from a sling, while in battle, years before his death. He was killed in battle by the arrow found among his ribs, during the last great struggle of the Lamanites and Nephites."

A few days after the open vision, the Prophet Joseph Smith in a letter to his wife Emma on June 4, 1834 near Atlas, Illinois on the Mississippi River said the following: "The whole of our journey, in the midst of so large a company of social honest and sincere men, wandering over the plains of the Nephites, recounting occasionally the history of the Book of Mormon, roving over the mounds of that once beloved people of the Lord, picking up their skulls & their bones, as a proof of its divine authenticity ... During our travels we visited several of the mounds which had been thrown up by the ancient inhabitants of this country-Nephites, Lamanites, etc.

South America models
An unsigned document in the handwriting of early church leader Frederick G. Williams alleges that Lehi landed 30 degrees South of the equator, in what would be modern day Chile. There are several theories that try to confirm this. Many people who support this group of theories believe that part of South America was under water, and that the continent rose up during the major earthquakes mentioned in the Book of Mormon during Christ's crucifixion in the Old World.

Birrell 1948
The Narrow Neck of land is the Maranon River narrows, or the Andean passes in Southern Ecuador.  Source:  Verla Birrell, The Book of Mormon Guide Book, SLC, 1948

Priddis 1975 model
The narrow neck is from Guayaquil, Ecuador to the Amazon basin, which before Christ was under water.

Kocherhans 1986 model
The narrow neck is the Andes Mountains around Guayaquil, Ecuador.

Great Lakes theories
Proponents of the Great Lakes theory adhere to the teachings of LDS Church leaders, official church history, and church canon that identify the hill in Palmyra, New York as the Hill Cumorah of the Book of Mormon, the place of the final Nephite battle. Great Lakes theories differ in that they incorporate the land of Palmyra, New York as the place of the final Nephite battle and the place where the Jaredite Omer walked.

Curtis 1988 model
Claims the Narrow Neck is the isthmus between Lake Erie and Lake Ontario.

Holley 1983
Source:  Vernal Holley, Book of Mormon Authorship: A Closer Look, Zenos Publications, Ogden, Utah, 1983. Holley held various mid-level LDS leadership positions. See also the Spalding-Rigdon theory.
Maps of Holley's proposed locations: Book of Mormon Locations and Places.

Olive 2000
Source:  Phyllis Carol Olive, The Lost Lands of the Book of Mormon, Printed by Bonneville Books, Springville, Utah, first printing 2000. , Library of Congress Catalog Number 94-98119. For the most current treatment, discussion and map of the setting visit: [bookofmormonlands.com] and [bookofmormonpromisedland.com]

Coon 2009
Source:  W. Vincent Coon, Choice Above All Other Lands, Book of Mormon Covenant Lands According to the Best Sources, Printed by Brit Publishing, Salt Lake City, Utah, first printing 2009. . Coon (MS Physics, Hebrew language background) is an advocate of Olive's work. [bookofmormonpromisedland.com]

Alternative theories
Some people believe that the Book of Mormon took place in areas outside of the Americas.

The African theory
Embaye Melekin is the author. Michael R. Ash wrote a review of this theory in 2001. Melekin claims that his book titled, "Manifestations mysteries revealed," has proven "beyond the shadow of a doubt that the Book of Mormon is an African book and about Africans. ... My book will change the church and the belief of the Mormons drastically."

The Malay model
The Malay Book of Mormon geography model asserts that the Book of Mormon account matches the geography and historical record of the Malay Peninsula. The starting point for this theory is the claim that a 4,000 mile journey to the Malay Peninsula, with appropriate winds and currents from the Middle East, would have been much easier for the Jaredites, Mulekites and Lehites than a 16,000 mile voyage across the Indian and Pacific Oceans (with no appropriate currents) to the Americas. The proponent of this theory, Ralph Olsen, notes several hundred reasons that his theory is superior to New World-based explanations. The Malay theory relies upon ongoing linguistic, genetic and archaeological research as a foundation to resolve most of the anachronisms that exist in other Book of Mormon geographies.

The Isle of the Sea model (Island model)
An island setting for Book of Mormon account was first proposed by Blake Ostler in his Sunstone article titled "DNA Strands in the Book of Mormon". Ostler asserts that the Book of Mormon events must have taken place on an island as was claimed by Jacob after arriving in the promised land.

The Island of the Sea model builds on the work of Ralph Olsen's Malay model with particular emphasis on genetic, linguistic and archaeological research within Southeast Asia and the Austronesian islands. The Isle of the Sea model also draws on early Judeo-Christian texts such as the Narrative of Zosimus and the History of the Rechabites to position the Book of Mormon as a 5th-century apocryphal text composed in an old world setting, a proposition advanced by Dr. Paul Owen.

The Isle of the Sea model proposes that the Islands of the Blessed described in early Judeo-Christian texts are synonymous with those mentioned by Jacob in 2 Nephi 10:20. These islands are identified in Greek and Roman sources as the land of the Camarines  believed to be associated with the Malay Peninsula, which was known in ancient sources as the Golden Chersonese or the Golden Island (Suvarnadvipa), and the islands of the Indonesian archipelago.

See also

Origin of the Book of Mormon
Historical authenticity of the Book of Mormon
Archaeology and the Book of Mormon

Footnotes

Notes

References

Further reading

Book of Mormon studies
Mormon apologetics
Book of Mormon geography